Kobylany  is a village in the administrative district of Gmina Terespol, within Biała Podlaska County, Lublin Voivodeship, in eastern Poland, close to the border with Belarus.

History
The Nazis established a labor camp, which existed between autumn 1942 and February 1944, for Jews from Czechoslovakia and surrounding towns and villages. There were Jews from the Terespol ghetto among the camp prisoners. Frequently, the Jews who were deemed unfit for work were shot in a forest near the camp. According to the Polish archives, more than 800 Jews from the Malaszewicze labor camp were also shot in a forest near Kobylany in several mass graves. One of the execution sites is located in Kobylany, close to the former fort. The executions lasted from 1943 till 1944.

References

Villages in Biała Podlaska County
Holocaust locations in Poland